The 2009 European Rally Championship season was the 57th season of the FIA European Rally Championship. The season had 11 rallies, of which Giandomenico Basso won 7 and thus claimed his second European rally championship title.

Calendar and winners
For the 2009 season, the number of rounds was increased from 9 to 11. The calendar featured 3 new rallies (in Spain, Greece and Switzerland), whereas Rally Poland was a round of the World Rally Championship in that year.

Championship standings
For the final classification in a rally, the winner was awarded 10 points, the runner-up 8 and the third placed driver 6. Drivers ranked 4 to 8 got 5–4–3–2–1 point(s). Additionally, the top three of every leg got 3–2–1 point(s). Only drivers who participated in least 6 events qualified for the championship ranking.

References

External links
 Official website 

European Rally Championship
European Rally Championship seasons
Rally